"Love Again" is a song by American recording artist Brandy and Canadian recording artist Daniel Caesar from Caesar's second album Case Study 01 and Brandy's seventh album B7. It was released to streaming and digital outlets as a single on July 5, 2019.

Background

In 2018, it was revealed that Daniel Caesar and Brandy Norwood were in the recording studio together. Both Norwood and Caesar were working on their respective albums at the time, and rumors of a duet began to arise. On June 28, 2019, Caesar released his second album Case Study 01, which featured the song. 
Norwood recorded a solo version of the song and released it as an online lyric video on June 19, 2020, as promotion for her seventh studio album, B7.

Critical reception
The song received generally positive reviews from music critics upon its release. Gil Kaufman from Billboard noted that the song "perfectly blends Brandy's signature breathy, sultry vocals and Caesar's soulful singing." The Daily Californian praised the song in its review of Caesar's album, comparing it to Caesar's duet with R&B singer H.E.R., calling the song "sweet and sanguine," while noting that vocally "Caesar's siren cadence melds delectably into Brandy's low, riff-filled croons." Robin Murray for Clash Music also praised the song, calling it the "perfect collaboration" and a "neat balance between raw youth and experience." Holly Gordon of the Canadian Broadcasting Corporation also gave the song a positive review, calling it a "slow burn of an earworm that is begging for a smooth set of repeats."

In a dissatisfied review of Caesar's album, Vice gave the song a positive review, specifically praising Brandy's vocals and contribution, noting Brandy's "growling passion," saying that she sounds "as youthful as she did [on albums like 1998's Never Say Never]. Overall, Vice concluded that the song "is a great reminder for anyone who had ever discounted her legacy in R&B". Now regarded the song "one of the simplest songs on the album," but also referred to it as "one of the best [songs on the album]."

Release and impact
"Love Again" debuted on June 28, 2019, with worldwide premiere on iHeartRadio, playing on the hour every on the hour. Following its release, the song debuted at number 24 on the US Bubbling Under Hot 100 Singles chart and was the most added song at Urban AC radio format for three consecutive weeks. Internationally, it debuted at number 95 on the Canadian Hot 100, and at number 15 on the New Zealand Hot 40 Singles chart. The song was then released as a single via digital download and streaming on July 5, 2019.

Accolades
"Love Again" received a nomination for Best R&B Performance at the 62nd Grammy Awards. It lost to Anderson Paak and André 3000's "Come Home" (2019).

Credits and personnel
Credits lifted from the liner notes of B7.

 Riley Bell – mixing, mastering
 Edward Blackmon – writer
 Paul Boutin – recording engineer
 Matthew Burnett – writer, producer, instruments, programming
 Daniel Caesar – performer, writer
 Darhyl Camper, Jr. – writer, additional keyboards

 Jordan Evans – writer, producer, instruments, programming
 Morning Estrada – recording engineer
 Matthew Leon – writer
 Brandy Norwood – performer, writer
 Gabriel Placentia – assistant engineer

Charts

Weekly charts

Year-end charts

Certifications and sales

Release history

References

External links
4everbrandy.com – official website

2019 singles
2019 songs
Brandy Norwood songs
Daniel Caesar songs
Male–female vocal duets
Songs written by Brandy Norwood
Songs written by Daniel Caesar
Songs written by Darhyl Camper